The Wapsipinicon River Bridge is a historic structure located in Independence, Iowa, United States. The Buchanan County Board of Supervisors contracted with the Miller-Taylor Construction Company from Waterloo, Iowa, to build the new bridge on the south side of Independence for $37,680. However, high water created problems during construction, and the bridge was completed in January 1927 for $57,530. It replaced an earlier two-span iron truss bridge. This bridge is a concrete filled spandrel arch bridge with four spans. It was designed by the Iowa State Highway Commission, and continues to carry vehicle traffic. The bridge was listed on the National Register of Historic Places in 1998. There is a similar bridge upstream in Independence that was built in 1918.

See also
List of bridges documented by the Historic American Engineering Record in Iowa

References

External links

Bridges completed in 1927
Independence, Iowa
Bridges in Buchanan County, Iowa
Historic American Engineering Record in Iowa
National Register of Historic Places in Buchanan County, Iowa
Road bridges on the National Register of Historic Places in Iowa
Arch bridges in Iowa
Concrete bridges in the United States